The 2022 Judo Grand Slam Tbilisi was to be held in Tbilisi, Georgia, from 25 to 27 March 2022. On 3 March 2022, it was postponed to 3–5 June 2022.

Event videos
The event was aired on the IJF YouTube channel.

Medal summary

Men's events

Women's events

Source Results

Medal table

Prize money
The sums written are per medalist, bringing the total prizes awarded to 154,000€.

References

External links
 

2022 IJF World Tour
2022 Judo Grand Slam
Grand Slam 2022
Judo
Judo
Judo
Judo